Gagandeep Singh may refer to:

 Gagandeep Singh (cricketer, born 1981), Indian cricketer
 Gagandeep Singh (cricketer, born 1987), Indian cricketer
 Gagandeep Singh (footballer) (born 1985), Indian footballer

See also
 Gagandeep Singh Lally (born 1995), Norwegian footballer